John Joseph Travolta (born February 18, 1954) is an American actor. He came to public attention during the 1970s, appearing on the television sitcom Welcome Back, Kotter (1975–1979) and starring in the box office successes Carrie (1976), Saturday Night Fever (1977), Grease (1978), and Urban Cowboy (1980). His acting career declined throughout the 1980s, but he enjoyed a resurgence in the 1990s with his role in Pulp Fiction (1994), and went on to star in films including Get Shorty (1995), Broken Arrow (1996), Phenomenon (1996), Face/Off (1997), A Civil Action (1998), Primary Colors (1998), Hairspray (2007), and Bolt (2008).

Travolta was nominated for the Academy Award for Best Actor for his performances in Saturday Night Fever and Pulp Fiction. He won a Golden Globe Award for Best Actor in a Motion Picture – Musical or Comedy for his performance in Get Shorty and has received a total of six nominations, the most recent being in 2011. In 2014, he received the IIFA Award for Outstanding Achievement in International Cinema. In 2016, Travolta received his first Primetime Emmy Award, as a producer of the first season of the anthology series American Crime Story, subtitled The People v. O. J. Simpson. He also received an additional Emmy nomination and a Golden Globe nomination for his portrayal of lawyer Robert Shapiro in the series. 

Outside of acting, Travolta is also a singer-songwriter. He has released 9 albums, including 4 singles that have charted on the Billboard Hot 100's Top 40. His albums have been typically accompanied with films he's starred in, such as Grease: The Original Soundtrack from the Motion Picture (1978)–which topped the Billboard 200. Travolta is also a private pilot.

Early life
The youngest of six children, Travolta was born and raised in Englewood, New Jersey, an inner-ring suburb of New York City in Bergen County, New Jersey.

His father, Salvatore "Sam" Travolta (November 8, 1912 – May 29, 1995), was a semiprofessional American football player turned tire salesman and partner in a tire company, Travolta Tire Exchange. His mother, Helen Cecilia (née Burke; January 18, 1912 – December 2, 1978), was an actress and singer who had appeared in The Sunshine Sisters, a radio vocal group, and acted and directed before becoming a high school drama and English teacher. His siblings Joey, Ellen, Ann, Margaret, and Sam Travolta were all inspired by their mother's love of theatre and drama and became actors. His father was a second-generation Sicilian American with roots in Godrano, Province of Palermo, and his mother was Irish American. 

He grew up in an Irish-American neighborhood and said that his household was predominantly Irish in culture. He was raised Catholic, but later converted to Scientology in 1975 at age 21. Travolta attended Dwight Morrow High School, but dropped out as a junior at age 17 in 1971.

Career

Early career

After dropping out of school, Travolta moved across the Hudson River to New York City and landed a role in the touring company of the musical Grease and on Broadway in Over Here!, singing the Sherman Brothers' song "Dream Drummin'". He then moved to Los Angeles for professional reasons.

Travolta's first screen role in California was as a fall victim in Emergency! (Season 2, Episode 2) in September, 1972, but his first significant movie role was as Billy Nolan, a bully who was goaded into playing a prank on Sissy Spacek's character in the horror film Carrie (1976). Around that time, he landed his star-making role as Vinnie Barbarino in the ABC TV sitcom Welcome Back, Kotter (1975–1979), in which his sister, Ellen, also occasionally appeared (as Arnold Horshack's mother).

1970s stardom
Travolta had a hit single titled "Let Her In", peaking at number 10 on the Billboard Hot 100 chart in July 1976. In the next few years, he starred in the television movie The Boy in the Plastic Bubble and two of his most noted screen roles: Tony Manero in Saturday Night Fever (1977) and Danny Zuko in Grease (1978). The films were among the most commercially successful pictures of the decade and catapulted Travolta to international stardom. Saturday Night Fever earned him an Academy Award nomination for Best Actor, making him, at age 24, one of the youngest performers ever nominated for the Best Actor Oscar. His mother and his sister Ann appeared very briefly in Saturday Night Fever and his sister Ellen played a waitress in Grease. Travolta performed on the Grease soundtrack album. After the failure of the romance Moment by Moment (1978) in which he starred with Lily Tomlin, Travolta rebounded in 1980, riding a nationwide country music craze that followed on the heels of his hit film Urban Cowboy, in which he starred with Debra Winger.

1980s downturn

Travolta followed up Urban Cowboy with a starring role in Brian de Palma's 1981 film Blow Out, which was critically lauded but a box office disappointment, likely due to its bleak ending. After Blow Out came a series of commercial and critical failures which sidelined Travolta's acting career. These included Two of a Kind (1983), a romantic comedy reuniting him with Olivia Newton-John, and Perfect (1985), co-starring Jamie Lee Curtis. He also starred in Staying Alive, the 1983 sequel to Saturday Night Fever, for which he trained rigorously to portray a professional dancer and lost 20 pounds; the film was a financial success, grossing over $65 million, though it, too, was scorned by critics.

During that time, Travolta was offered, but declined, lead roles in what would become box-office hits, including American Gigolo and An Officer and a Gentleman, both of which went to Richard Gere, as well as Splash, which went to Tom Hanks.

1990s resurgence

In 1989, Travolta starred with Kirstie Alley in Look Who's Talking, which grossed $297 million, making it his most successful film since Grease. He subsequently starred in Look Who's Talking Too (1990) and Look Who's Talking Now (1993), but it was not until he played against type as Vincent Vega in Quentin Tarantino's hit Pulp Fiction (1994), with Samuel L. Jackson, for which he received an Academy Award nomination, that his career was revived. It was Travolta's third film alongside Bruce Willis. The movie shifted him back onto the A-list and he was inundated with many diverse offers. Notable roles following Pulp Fiction include a movie-buff loan shark in Get Shorty (1995), a factory worker in White Man's Burden (1995), a corrupt U.S. Air Force pilot in Broken Arrow (1996), an everyman with extraordinary powers in Phenomenon (1996), an archangel in Michael (1996), an FBI agent and terrorist in Face/Off (1997), a desperate attorney in A Civil Action (1998), a Bill Clinton–esque presidential candidate in Primary Colors (1998), and a military investigator in The General's Daughter (1999).

2000–present
In 2000, Travolta starred in and co-produced the science fiction film Battlefield Earth, based on the novel of the same name by L. Ron Hubbard, in which he played the villainous leading role as a leader of a group of aliens that enslaves humanity on a bleak future Earth. The film was a dream project for Travolta since the book's release in 1982, when Hubbard wrote to him to try to help make a film adaptation. The film received almost universally negative reviews and did very poorly at the box office. Travolta's performance in Battlefield Earth also earned him two Razzie Awards.

Throughout the 2000s, Travolta remained busy as an actor, starring in Swordfish (2001); Domestic Disturbance (2001); Ladder 49 (2004); Be Cool (2005); Lonely Hearts (2006); Wild Hogs (2007); the Disney computer animated film Bolt (2008), in which Travolta voiced the title character; The Taking of Pelham 123; and Old Dogs (both 2009).

In 2007, Travolta played Edna Turnblad in the remake of Hairspray, his first musical since Grease.

Since 2010, Travolta has starred mostly in action films and thrillers, such as From Paris with Love (2010) and Savages (2012). In 2016, he returned to television in the first season of the anthology series American Crime Story, titled The People v. O. J. Simpson, in which he played lawyer Robert Shapiro.

At the 86th Academy Awards, Travolta notoriously mispronounced Idina Menzel, calling her "Adele Dazeem". Menzel performed the award-winning song "Let It Go" from the Disney animated movie Frozen.

Following the death of his wife Kelly Preston in July 2020, Travolta hinted on his Instagram account that he would be putting his career on hold, stating "I will be taking some time to be there for my children who have lost their mother, so forgive me in advance if you don't hear from us for a while."

Personal life

Family

Travolta was in a relationship with actress Diana Hyland, whom he met while filming The Boy in the Plastic Bubble (1976). They remained together until Hyland's death from breast cancer on March 27, 1977. In 1980, Travolta dated French actress Catherine Deneuve. Travolta also had an on-again/off-again relationship with actress Marilu Henner, which ended permanently in 1985. In 1988 while filming The Experts, Travolta met actress Kelly Preston, whom he married in Paris in 1991. They had three children: Jett (1992–2009), Ella Bleu (born 2000), and Benjamin (born 2010). They regularly attended marriage counseling and Travolta has stated that therapy helped the marriage. They resided in Ocala, Florida.

On January 2, 2009, Jett died at age 16 while on a Christmas vacation in the Bahamas. A Bahamian death certificate was issued, attributing the cause of death to a seizure. Jett, who had a history of seizures, reportedly suffered from Kawasaki disease since the age of two. Travolta confirmed that Jett was autistic and suffered regular seizures, and immediately made his public statements while giving testimony at a multimillion-dollar extortion plot against him in connection with Jett's death. After a mistrial, Travolta dropped the charges and has credited his immediate family and Scientology with helping him to cope with Jett's death and move forward with his career. In memory of Jett, Travolta created the Jett Travolta Foundation, a nonprofit organization to help children with special needs. It has contributed to organizations such as the Oprah Winfrey Leadership Academy, Institutes for the Achievement of Human Potential, and Simon Wiesenthal Center.

On July 12, 2020, Travolta's wife, Kelly Preston, died at the age of 57, two years after she was diagnosed with breast cancer. Preston was receiving treatment at the MD Anderson Cancer Center in Houston, Texas; she was also treated at other medical centers. Preston was at her home in Anthony, Florida, when she died.

Scientology
Travolta has been a member of the Church of Scientology since 1975. He converted after being given the book Dianetics while filming The Devil's Rain in Durango, Mexico.

Travolta also starred in and co-produced the 2000 American science-fiction film Battlefield Earth, which was based off of the science fiction novel of the same name by L. Ron Hubbard, the founder of the Church of Scientology. There have been numerous allegations that this film was made with the exclusive backing of the Church of Scientology. It was a notorious box-office bomb, which has won 8 Golden Raspberry Awards to date, along with the Worst Picture of the Decade at the 30th Golden Raspberry Awards. It is listed on Rotten Tomatoes currently with a score of 3% based on 152 reviews with an average rating of 2.8/10. It has been rated consecutively by film critics as one of the worst films of all time.

After the 2010 Haiti earthquake, joining other celebrities in helping with the relief efforts, Travolta reportedly flew his Boeing 707 full of supplies, doctors, and Scientologist Volunteer Ministers into the disaster area.

Aviation

Travolta is a private pilot and owns four aircraft.

Travolta owned an ex-Qantas Boeing 707-138B (Ex-VH-EBM) which bears an old livery of Qantas, and Travolta acted as an official goodwill ambassador for the airline wherever he flew. Travolta named his 707 "Jett Clipper Ella", in honor of his children. The "Clipper" in the name refers to the use of that word by Pan Am in the names of their aircraft. In 2017, Travolta donated the Boeing 707 to the Historical Aircraft Restoration Society (HARS) near Wollongong, Australia. This was expected to be flown to Australia in November 2019, but was later delayed to sometime in 2020 due to condition of the aircraft. Travolta planned to be on board when the aircraft was to be flown to Illawarra Regional Airport, where HARS is based, however was not allowed to fly it, because it was to be registered as an Australian aircraft. 

His estate in Ocala, Florida, is situated at Jumbolair Airport with its own runway and taxiway right to his house, with two outbuildings for covered access to planes.

In 1984, Travolta was inducted into the American Academy of Achievement and presented with the Golden Plate Award by Awards Council member General Chuck Yeager, USAF.

On November 24, 1992, Travolta was piloting his Gulfstream N728T at night above a solid undercast when he experienced a total electrical system failure while flying under instrument flight rules into Washington National Airport. During the emergency landing, he almost had a mid-air collision with a USAir Boeing 727, an event attributed to a risky decision by an air traffic controller.

Travolta was inducted into the Living Legends of Aviation in 2007 and acts as the award show's official ambassador.

On September 13, 2010, during the first episode of the final season of her talk show, Oprah Winfrey announced that she would be taking her entire studio audience on an eight-day, all-expenses-paid trip to Australia, with Travolta serving as pilot for the trip. He had helped Winfrey plan the trip for more than a year.

He is the author of the book Propeller One-Way Night Coach, the story of a young boy's first flight.

Travolta is rated to 737, 707 and 747 planes.

Legal issues
In May 2012, an anonymous male masseur filed a lawsuit against Travolta, citing claims of sexual assault and battery. A lawyer for Travolta said that the allegations were "complete fiction and fabrication". Travolta's counsel also stated that his client would be able to prove that he was not in California on the day in question and asserted that Travolta would "sue the attorney and Plaintiff for malicious prosecution" after getting the case thrown out. A second masseur later joined the lawsuit, making similar claims. Both lawsuits were subsequently dropped by the complainants and dismissed without prejudice.

On September 27, 2012, Los Angeles Superior Court Judge Malcolm Mackey dismissed a defamation lawsuit against Travolta and his attorney Marty Singer by writer Robert Randolph because he found that a letter, written by Singer in response to allegations in a book by Randolph, was protected by free speech.

Filmography

Discography

Albums

Singles

Awards and nominations

See also
 List of oldest and youngest Academy Award winners and nominees – Youngest Nominees for Best Actor in a Leading Role

Explanatory notes

References

Further reading
 Tast, Brigitte (ed.). John Travolta. (Hildesheim/Germany 1978.) .

External links

 
 
 
 
 
 
 John Travolta at Hollywood Walk of Fame
 

 
1954 births
Living people
20th-century American male actors
20th-century American singers
21st-century American male actors
21st-century American singers
American aviators
American film producers
American former Christians
American male dancers
American male film actors
American male musical theatre actors
American male pop singers
American male singers
American male stage actors
American male television actors
American male voice actors
American people of Irish descent
American people of Italian descent
American Scientologists
Best Musical or Comedy Actor Golden Globe (film) winners
Converts to Scientology from Roman Catholicism
David di Donatello winners
Dwight Morrow High School alumni
Film producers from Florida
Film producers from New Jersey
Former Roman Catholics
Male actors from Florida
Male actors from Maine
Male actors from New Jersey
Musicians from Ocala, Florida
New Jersey Hall of Fame inductees
People from Englewood, New Jersey
People from Islesboro, Maine
Primetime Emmy Award winners
Singers from Florida
Singers from Maine
Singers from New Jersey
Television producers from Florida
Television producers from New Jersey
Travolta family